Falimery Dafé Ramanamahefa (born 22 November 1991) is a Malagasy professional footballer who plays as a midfielder for Championnat National 2 club Châteaubriant and the Madagascar national team.

International goals
Scores and results list Madagascar's goal tally first.

References

External links
 
 
 

1991 births
Living people
Madagascar international footballers
Malagasy footballers
Association football midfielders
Tana FC Formation players
RC Lens players
US Tourcoing FC players
La Flèche RC players
Voltigeurs de Châteaubriant players
Championnat National 2 players
Championnat National 3 players